Ethyl butyrate, also known as ethyl butanoate, or butyric ether, is an ester with the chemical formula CH3CH2CH2COOCH2CH3. It is soluble in propylene glycol, paraffin oil, and kerosene.  It has a fruity odor, similar to pineapple, and is a key ingredient used as a flavor enhancer in processed orange juices. It also occurs naturally in many fruits, albeit at lower concentrations.

Uses
It is commonly used as artificial flavoring resembling orange juice and is hence used in nearly all orange juices sold, including those sold as "fresh" or “concentrated". It is also used  in alcoholic beverages (e.g. martinis, daiquiris etc.), as a solvent in perfumery products, and as a plasticizer for cellulose.

Ethyl butyrate is one of the most common chemicals used in flavors and fragrances.  It can be used in a variety of flavors: orange (most common), cherry, pineapple, mango, guava, bubblegum, peach, apricot, fig, and plum.  In industrial use, it is also one of the cheapest chemicals, which only adds to its popularity.

Production
It can be synthesized by reacting ethanol and butyric acid. This is a condensation reaction, meaning water is produced in the reaction as a byproduct. Ethyl butyrate from natural sources can be distinguished from synthetic ethyl butyrate by Stable Isotope Ratio Analysis (SIRA).

Table of physical properties

See also
 Butyric acid
 Butyrates
 Methyl butyrate

References

External links
 MSDS sheet
 Sorption of ethyl butyrate and octanal constituents of orange essence by polymeric adsorbents 
 Biosynthesis of ethyl butyrate using immobilized lipase: a statistical approach 

Ethyl esters
Butyrate esters
Ester solvents
Flavors
Plasticizers
Sweet-smelling chemicals